The Kazakh ambassador in Washington, D. C. is the official representative of the Government in Astana to the Government of the United States and is concurrently accredited in Brasilia.

List of representatives

See also
 Kazakhstan–United States relations
 List of ambassadors of the United States to Kazakhstan

References 

 
United States
Kazakhstan